David C. Kronick (born September 4, 1932) is an American Democratic Party politician who served in the New Jersey General Assembly from the 32nd Legislative District from 1988 to 1994.

References

1932 births
Living people
Democratic Party members of the New Jersey General Assembly